"The Way I Feel Tonight" is a pop ballad by the Bay City Rollers from their 1977 album It's a Game.  The tune, written by Harvey Shield, and featuring a lead vocal by Les McKeown, is a slow, dramatic ballad with a heavily orchestrated arrangement.  

The song was released as a 7" vinyl single in numerous territories, and had a peak position of No. 24 on the Billboard Hot 100 chart.  It was the Rollers' final charting US single, but was also their second and highest entry on the Adult Contemporary chart, where it peaked at No. 16.

Track listing
1. "The Way I Feel Tonight" - 3:28
2. "Love Power" - 3:35

Credits
 Producer - Harry Maslin
 Written By - Harvey Shield

Chart performance

References

External links
 

Bay City Rollers songs
1977 singles
1977 songs
Song recordings produced by Harry Maslin
Arista Records singles